None is the second EP by Swedish extreme metal band Meshuggah. It was released on 8 November 1994 via Nuclear Blast. The band started embracing a more complex approach that would lay the grounds for their later style. The EP has been reissued by Nuclear Blast in Nov. 2018, the first four tracks are also available on the Contradictions Collapse reissue while the fifth track is on the Destroy Erase Improve reissue. This is the band's first release to feature rhythm guitarist Mårten Hagström.

Track listing
Vinyl releases have tracks 1–3 on side A, and tracks 4-5 on side B

Personnel
Jens Kidman – vocals
 Tomas Haake – drums
 Peter Nordin – bass
 Fredrik Thordendal – lead guitar, rhythm guitar, backing vocals
 Mårten Hagström – rhythm guitar, backing vocals

References

Meshuggah albums
1994 EPs
Nuclear Blast EPs